This is a list of career statistics of Ukrainian tennis player Elina Svitolina since her professional debut in 2010. Svitolina has won sixteen singles and two doubles WTA titles.

Performance timelines

Only main-draw results in WTA Tour, Grand Slam tournaments, Fed Cup/Billie Jean King Cup and Olympic Games are included in win–loss records.

Singles

Current through the 2022 Miami.

Notes
 WTA Tournament of Champions was held from 2009 to 2014, when WTA Elite Trophy replaced it.
 The first Premier 5 event of the year has switched back and forth between the Dubai Tennis Championships and the Qatar Total Open since 2009. Dubai was classified as a Premier 5 event from 2009–2011 before being succeeded by Doha for the 2012–2014 period. In 2015, Dubai regained its Premier 5 status while Doha was demoted to Premier status. The two tournaments have since alternated status every year.
 Held as Pan Pacific Open until 2013, Wuhan Open since 2014.
2010: WTA ranking – 498.

Doubles

Mixed doubles

Significant finals

WTA Finals

Singles: 2 (1 title, 1 runner-up)

WTA Elite Trophy

Singles: 1 (1 runner-up)

WTA 1000 finals

Singles: 4 (4 titles)

Olympic Games

Singles: 1 (bronze medal)

WTA career finals

Singles: 19 (16 titles, 3 runner-ups)

Doubles: 2 (2 titles)

Team competition: 1 (1 runner-up)

WTA Challenger finals

Singles: 1 (1 title)

ITF finals

Singles: 8 (6 titles, 2 runner-ups)

Doubles: 6 (2 titles, 4 runner-ups)

Junior Grand Slam finals

Girls' singles: 2 (1 title, 1 runner-up)

Girls' doubles: 1 (1 runner-up)

WTA ranking

WTA Tour career earnings

Career Grand Slam statistics

Grand Slam tournament seedings
The tournaments won by Svitolina are in boldface, and advanced into finals by Svitolina are in italics.

Best Grand Slam tournament results details

Longest winning streaks

15 match win streak (2017)
The 15 consecutive matches won by Svitolina in the spring was the longest win-streak of any player in 2017.

Record against other players

Record against top 10 players
Svitolina's record against players who have been ranked in the top 10. Active players are in boldface:

Record against No. 11–20 players

Svitolina's record against players who have been ranked world No. 11–20.
	
 Daria Gavrilova 7–2
 Alizé Cornet 5–3
 Donna Vekić 4–0	
 Petra Martić 4–1
 Wang Qiang 3–1	
 Alison Riske 3–1	
 Anastasija Sevastova 3–1	
 Elise Mertens 3–2	
 Elena Vesnina 3–2
 Markéta Vondroušová 3–2
 Sabine Lisicki 2–0
 Karolína Muchová 2–0	
 Shahar Pe'er 2–0
 Barbora Strýcová 2–0	
 Yanina Wickmayer 2–0	
 Ana Konjuh 2–1	
 Varvara Lepchenko 2–1
 Elena Rybakina 2–1
 Anastasia Pavlyuchenkova 2–3	
 Kirsten Flipkens 1–0
 Coco Gauff 1–0	
 Kaia Kanepi 1–0	
 Jennifer Brady 1–1	
 Peng Shuai 1–1
 Magdaléna Rybáriková 1–1	
 Mihaela Buzărnescu 1–2
 Jessica Pegula 1–2
 Zheng Jie 0–1
 Klára Koukalová 0–2

* Statistics correct .

No. 1 wins

Top 10 wins
Svitolina has a  record against players who were, at the time the match was played, ranked in the top 10 as of April 24, 2021.

References

External links
 
 
 Elina Svitolina's CoreTennis Profile

Svitolina, Elina